Golden Axe: The Revenge of Death Adder is an arcade game released by Sega in 1992. It is the sequel to the original Golden Axe and features the same hack and slash action as its predecessor with new additions and improvements. Powered by the System 32 arcade board, Revenge of Death Adder features more detailed graphics, adds new selectable characters and doubles the maximum number of simultaneous players from two to four. None of the three characters from the previous game are playable, with players choosing from four new protagonists who battle through various levels to defeat the villainous Death Adder.

While the original Golden Axe saw release on various home platforms, Revenge of Death Adder remained an arcade exclusive. Instead Sega published a completely different game, Golden Axe II, for the Sega Genesis. Revenge of Death Adder was not officially released for the home until 2020, when it was paired with the first Golden Axe on both the Astro City Mini and Arcade1Up's smaller scale recreation of the original arcade cabinet.

Gameplay
The player characters are Goah the giant, Stern Blade the barbarian, Dora the Kentauride, and Little Trix, a young elf lad who carries a pitchfork. None of the characters from the first game are playable, although Gilius Thunderhead from the first game rides on Goah's back, and casts the magic spells between the two, while Goah does the fighting. The main enemy is once again Death Adder. Multiple players could cooperate to complete wrestling moves on one enemy. Depending on the cabinet, the game allowed up to two, three or four simultaneous players.

As well as introducing multiple paths to the franchise, the magic aspect is adjusted. Though still found in the classic Golden Axe pots, the magic spells do not increase in power with the number of pots collected but require a set number to work. The Revenge of Death Adder is the only Golden Axe game in which one of the magic attacks is not offensive, as Trix grows apple trees with fruit that replenish health. The players are allowed to choose different pathways at two Three-way junctions. Depending on the version, the unchosen paths are skipped entirely or have to be passed later in the game.

Reception 
In Japan, Game Machine listed Golden Axe: The Revenge of Death Adder on their November 15, 1992 issue as being the third most-successful table arcade unit of the month.

In 2023, Time Extension included the game on their top 25 "Best Beat 'Em Ups of All Time" list. They called it the best game in the series.

References

External links

1992 video games
Arcade video games
Arcade-only video games
Cooperative video games
Fantasy video games
Sega arcade games
Sega beat 'em ups
Side-scrolling beat 'em ups
Hack and slash games
Sega System 32 games
Video games developed in Japan
Video games featuring female protagonists
Golden Axe